The Montreal Alliance are a Canadian professional basketball team based in Montreal, Quebec, Canada founded in 2021. They compete in the Canadian Elite Basketball League (CEBL) and play their home games at the Verdun Auditorium. The Montreal Alliance’s mascot is called “Alli-Oop”.

History 

Most recently, the Montreal Jazz played its only season in the National Basketball League of Canada in the 2012–13 season. The team did not play in the 2013–14 NBL Canada season after failing to secure a new ownership group.

In February 2021, it was first announced that a Montreal team would join the CEBL in 2022. On October 27, 2021, the team name and branding was revealed. Joel Anthony was named the inaugural general manager of the Alliance the next month. The Montréal Alliance announced on Tuesday, March 8, 2022, that Vincent Lavandier had been named the first head coach of the Canadian Elite Basketball League (CEBL) expansion franchise.

Players

Current roster

Season-by-season record

Head coaches
 Vincent Lavandier: (2022)
 Derrick Alston, Sr.: (2023-present)

References

External links 
 Official website

Canadian Elite Basketball League teams
Basketball teams established in 2021
2021 establishments in Quebec
Basketball teams in Montreal